The Ruda is a left tributary of the river Suceava. Its source is located in Ukraine, in the proximity of the village of Bahrynivka. The river then flows across the border into Romania, where it crosses the villages of Baineț, Vicșani, and laz before joining the Suceava near the village of Dornești.

References

Rivers of Romania
Rivers of Chernivtsi Oblast
Rivers of Suceava County